Sangar is a locality, including a railway station in the south east part of the Riverina.  It is situated by road, about 12 kilometres north of Rennie and 21 kilometres south of Oaklands.

Transport

Railways

The station is located 303.329 km from Melbourne.  The station has a wheat silo.

Notes and references

Towns in the Riverina
Towns in New South Wales
Federation Council, New South Wales